The 1942–43 Serbian League (Serbian: 1942–43 Српска лига / 1942–43 Srpska liga) was a top level football league of the Serbian military administration (Serbia under German occupation) in the 1942–43 season.  It was won by BSK Belgrade.

Final table

See also
Serbian Football League (1940–1944)
Serbia under German occupation

References

Serbian Football League (1940–1944) seasons
Serbian League
Football
Football
Serbia
Serbia